This is a list of rural localities in Kursk Oblast. Kursk Oblast is a federal subject of Russia (an oblast). Its administrative center is the city of Kursk. Population: 1,127,081 (2010 Census).

Locations 
 1st Banino
 1st Chaplygina
 1st Gnezdilovo
 1st Mokva
 1st Rojdenstvenskoe
 2nd Banino
 2nd Gnezdilovo
 2nd Mokva
 2nd Rojdenstvenskoe
 Belaya

 Bolshoye Soldatskoye
 Kalinovka
 Manturovo

See also 
 
 Lists of rural localities in Russia

References 

Kursk Oblast